Southworth House may refer to:

Southworth House (Greenwood, Mississippi), listed on the National Register of Historic Places in Leflore County, Mississippi
 Southworth House (Dryden, New York), listed on the NRHP in Tompkins County, New York
 Southworth House (Cleveland, Ohio), listed on the NRHP in Cuyahoga County, Ohio